Limilngan, also known as Limil and Manidja (also spelt Manitja), is an extinct Aboriginal Australian language of the Top End of Australia.

Names and ownership
The language as well as its speakers are known by three names: Limilngan, Limil and Manidja / Manitja, the latter being an exonym.

Buneidja is regarded as the same language, and the people are sometimes referred to by this name.

Traditional lands
Limilngan was spoken in the Darwin hinterland, in the Mary River (Northern Territory) area of Kakadu.

Phonology 

The Limilngan language uses the three vowel system; /a/, /i/, /u/. The three sounds can result in allophones as /ɑ,æ/, /ɪ/, and /ʊ/.

Vocabulary
Limilngan plant and animal names:

Animals
{| class="wikitable sortable"
! English gloss !! Limilngan
|-
| animal || lulayi
|-
| bandicoot || urugalitjbagi
|-
| cattle || bulikgi
|-
| dingo || dimarrkginyan
|-
| dog || ngiliyi
|-
| dugong || anmat dumuligan
|-
| echidna || mumuligan mamban
|-
| flying fox (black) || mumalingan
|-
| flying fox (red) || lumarninyan damban
|-
| horse || nandu
|-
| kangaroo || anmat dumuligan
|-
| mouse || liyil
|-
| native cat || dirdatj
|-
| native cat || gitjbi damban
|-
| old man kangaroo || madlingi minyayan
|-
| possum || lulikbi dinyayan
|-
| sugar glider || marnijurrkgurrk
|-
| tree rat || luwarli
|-
| wallaby (agile) || bungal minyayan
|-
| wallaby (short-eared rock) || itbilinyngan
|-
| wallaroo (black) || lunybim
|-
| black-headed python || iwirli
|-
| black whipsnake || lamurr
|-
| blue tongue lizard || mimiluk minyayan
|-
| Burton's legless lizard || laminy dagiyan
|-
| carpet snake || irrun damban
|-
| crocodile || latdinyayan
|-
| death adder || iyatdururr
|-
| file snake || bitjjurnurnu
|-
| freshwater crocodile || linan dirrinyan
|-
| frill-necked lizard || lam
|-
| goanna sp. || mirtbinalk mamban
|-
| goanna sp. || birnirriny
|-
| goanna || limiji damban
|-
| golden tree snake || lagun
|-
| keelback snake || limin biyal
|-
| king brown snake || alinyman dinyayan
|-
| lizard sp. || badambip
|-
| lizard sp. || lanay
|-
| lizard sp. || liminalk
|-
| lizard sp. || minyim binyayan
|-
| long-necked turtle || lulayk
|-
| MacLeay's water snake (Pseudoferania polylepis) || layi
|-
| olive python || lumuwat dumuligan
|-
| short-necked turtle || lamuk dikbugan
|-
| skink || imin mirlarli
|-
| slaty-grey snake (Stegonotus cucullatus) || lambirli
|-
| turtle leg || milingbi
|-
| water goanna || ngugun dagiyan
|-
| water snake || lambugay
|-
| western brown snake || iyaturu
|-
| bird sp. || jitbulkbulk
|-
| bird sp. || luwutjgi
|-
| bittern || nawarral
|-
| black cockatoo || lurrilmal
|-
| black kite || limin binal
|-
| brolga || lurrilyarr
|-
| bustard || dumugarnyi
|-
| butcherbird || minbulungbulung
|-
| comb-crested jacana || liyiny
|-
| cormorant (large species) || lumuwulkbarl
|-
| crow || lagurr
|-
| curlew || girriluk ~ limiluk
|-
| darter || iminy
|-
| dove || guluduk
|-
| eagle (white-bellied sea) || imbinyman
|-
| eagle (wedge-tailed) || malungan
|-
| egg || umunngayan
|-
| egret || lurliny
|-
| emu || langitj
|-
| feather || lumulkban
|-
| flycatcher || wijit
|-
| galah || bilarrkbilarrk
|-
| goose || lamay
|-
| jabiru || larryal
|-
| jungle fowl || larnmingi dinyayan
|-
| kookaburra || lirrgi
|-
| long-tailed finch || mawitjbitj
|-
| magpie || jilalarr
|-
| magpie-lark || liwitjbut
|-
| masked lapwing || barrapbarrap
|-
| mopoke || gumitgumitgan
|-
| native hen || bibarrk
|-
| owl || mukmuk ilamirl
|-
| parrot (red-winged) || miyilarrk
|-
| pelican || marninyi mambirri
|-
| pheasant || mambarr birrinyan
|-
| pigeon (Torresian imperial) || lalkgi
|-
| plover || gurlawirtwirt
|-
| pygmy goose || laliny
|-
| quail || ligi
|-
| rainbow bee-eater || malarr
|-
| tern || larnung dirrinyngan ~ liwirarr dinyayan
|-
| whistling duck (plumed) || laminyanbarr
|-
| whistling duck (wandering) || danyarnngi
|-
| whistling kite || limarrambi
|-
| white cockatoo || ditjgan
|-
| white-throated grasswren || lamugarn
|-
| willy wagtail || jigirritj-jigirritj
|-
| wing || larnung
|-
| barramundi || diyan diminyan
|-
| black bream || luwitjbarl
|-
| catfish || gurdumardi
|-
| crab || makbangi dinyayan
|-
| crab || makbangi majan
|-
| eel || imilung dajan
|-
| fish || iwan
|-
| frog sp. || bagartbagart
|-
| garfish || jukjuk ilamirl
|-
| longbam || wugul-wugul
|-
| mangrove oyster || ulikbily
|-
| manta ray || langinyngan
|-
| mermaid || marung
|-
| mullet || ilyiwin muluman
|-
| mussel || liyinmungi
|-
| oyster || lumbangmam
|-
| prawn || lilkgany
|-
| sea snake || umalikgan
|-
| shark || arli
|-
| shellfish sp. || galpbangarruk
|-
| stingray || mumburarr
|-
| ant sp. || darnman
|-
| anthill || ayirri
|-
| blowfly || luwunbun
|-
| bull ant || luralkgalk
|-
| butterfly || mambirri
|-
| centipede || lurluk
|-
| dragon fly || liwijul
|-
| flea || manum birrinyan
|-
| fly || lalykgi
|-
| green ant || girralpbung
|-
| grub || limiyuk
|-
| hornet || uwurnitj
|-
| leech || lugi
|-
| little fly || luwutjgi
|-
| louse || limbi
|-
| louse egg || miyimbi
|-
| mangrove worm || dirrinyngangan
|-
| marchfly || lalk
|-
| mosquito || lanbayk
|-
| sandfly || mimilanitj
|-
| scorpion || lurngun
|-
| snail || lirrul
|-
| tick || mirtbinalk
|-
| wasp || malinyngan
|}

Plants
{| class="wikitable sortable"
! English gloss !! Limilngan
|-
| bamboo || mirnalitj
|-
| Banksia dentata || mambirram
|-
| banyon || minukban
|-
| billy goat plum || layi
|-
| black currant tree || manguk
|-
| black plum || miminikgitj
|-
| black wattle || iwirli
|-
| bush onion || lagurr
|-
| bush potato || bawitj
|-
| crab's eye vine || bakgarl
|-
| cycad || uwarrkbi
|-
| flower || mimilngan
|-
| grass || marniyi
|-
| grass (knife) || barram
|-
| green plum || ilidamban
|-
| Grewia retusifolia || magangurl
|-
| Haemodorum coccineum || wilwil ilam
|-
| ironwood || marral
|-
| ironwood wax || nguwuk
|-
| leaf || luwutjgi
|-
| lily (grass) || minumbirr
|-
| lily (red) || uwukgi damban
|-
| lily bulb (white) || minayuk
|-
| lily flower (white) || manyal
|-
| lily stem (white) || ulikbily
|-
| lily tuber (white) || mingililuk
|-
| dense tree cover || miyimil
|-
| milkwood || mimilugutj
|-
| palm species || dilimin langan
|-
| palm species || mulpbay
|-
| pandanus nut || langitj
|-
| Pandanus spiralis || liyarr
|-
| paperbark || agal
|-
| Persoonia falcata || latjji
|-
| Phragmites || lamitj
|-
| pig tucker tree || laliny
|-
| red apple || mamun birritj ~ mamun burrnginy
|-
| root || madlingi
|-
| scrub || lalagan
|-
| seaweed || malngi
|-
| stringybark || linngulitj
|-
| tea tree || agi-agi
|-
| tree || bangi
|-
| unidentified plant species || miyingal
|-
| white apple || lalykgi damban
|-
| white cedar || liwirnal
|-
| white gum || limin balyi
|-
| wild banana || langinyngan
|-
| wild peanut tree || imiligarnmi
|-
| woollybutt || muwurn ditjgan
|-
| yam (long) || limbi
|-
| yam (round) || mirnngayal
|-
| yam (water) || darndamban
|}

Footnotes

References

Limilngan–Wulna languages
Languages extinct in the 2000s